This is a list of Greek football transfers winter 2021–22. Only clubs in 2021–22 Super League Greece are included.

Greek Super League

AEK Athens FC

In:

Out:

Apollon Smyrnis

In:

Out:

Aris Thessaloniki

In:

Out:

Asteras Tripolis

In:

Out:

Atromitos

In:

Out:

Ionikos

In:

Out:

Lamia

In:

Out:

OFI

In:

Out:

Panathinaikos

In:

Out:

Olympiacos FC

In:

Out:

Panathinaikos

In:

Out:

Panetolikos

In:

Out:

PAOK

In:

Out:

PAS Giannina FC

In:

Out:

Volos

In:

Out:

References

Greece
Transfers
2021-21